The Sun class is a class of cruise ships originally built for by Princess Cruises and now operated by P&O Cruises Australia, both subsidiaries of Carnival Corporation & plc, Peace Boat and Seajets. The vessels in the class were designed and constructed by Fincantieri Cantieri Navali Italiani in Italy. The first Sun-class vessel,  (now Pacific World), entered service in 1995 and the last, Ocean Princess (now Queen of the Oceans) entered service in 2000. At the time of launch, the Sun class was amongst the largest cruise ships in the world, although this has since been surpassed.

The four ships are effectively identical, with the only notable exception being the design of the bridge wings; Pacific World and Pacific Explorer having exterior bridge wings, Charming and Queen of the Oceans having enclosed bridge wings.

Ships

References 

Cruise ship classes
Princess Cruises
Ships built by Fincantieri